Killing Season is the fifth album by the American thrash band Death Angel, released on February 26, 2008. Produced by Nick Raskulinecz (known for his work with Foo Fighters, Rush and Alice in Chains), it is the follow-up to the band's first reunion album, 2004's The Art of Dying, and marked the final Death Angel album to feature founding members Dennis Pepa (bass) and Andy Galeon (drums). Killing Season sold around 2,300 copies in its first week in the U.S.

Background 
On August 11, 2006, bassist Dennis Pepa spoke to The Gauntlet about the band's plans for a fifth album.

In February 2007, guitarist Rob Cavestany posted an update on the album. He writes:

On September 8, 2007, Blabbermouth.net reported that Death Angel would enter a studio in Los Angeles on September 16 to begin recording the album and Nick Raskulinecz was confirmed as the producer.

Also in September 2007, Cavestany posted another update on the album.

On October 23, 2007, Blabbermouth.net reported that Killing Season would be the title of the album. It was also announced that Cavestany had just posted several photos from the recording studio on his MySpace page.

On February 14, 2008, the entire album became available for streaming on the group's Myspace page.

Track listing

Personnel 
Mark Osegueda – lead vocals
Rob Cavestany – lead guitar, backing vocals
Ted Aguilar – rhythm guitar
Dennis Pepa – bass, backing vocals
Andy Galeon – drums

References 

Nuclear Blast albums
Death Angel albums
2008 albums
Albums produced by Nick Raskulinecz